Jan-Eric Antonsson (born 9 September 1961) is a retired male badminton player from Sweden.

Career
He won the bronze medal at the 1995 IBF World Championships in mixed doubles with Astrid Crabo. They also competed in badminton at the 1996 Summer Olympics and lost in the round of 16 to Trikus Heryanto and Minarti Timur.

Achievements

IBF World Grand Prix 
The World Badminton Grand Prix sanctioned by International Badminton Federation (IBF) from 1983 to 2006.

Men's doubles

References

External links
 
 
 
 
 

1961 births
Living people
Swedish male badminton players
Olympic badminton players of Sweden
Badminton players at the 1992 Summer Olympics
People from Karlskrona
Sportspeople from Blekinge County
20th-century Swedish people